Rafael Eitan Makif Ramat Gan High School is a high school in Ramat Gan, Tel Aviv District, Israel.

The school
The school was founded in 2003 and is located in Ramat Amidar, Ramat Gan. The school was named after Rafael Eitan, who was the 11th Chief of General Staff of the Israel Defense Forces, a member of the Knesset and a minister in the Israeli government.

As of 2018, 150 students are enrolled in the school, in grades 9–12, with an average of 1-2 classes per grade, with 20 faculty members and at the head of the school stands Eran Yerushalmi as the principal (since 2011). Former principals include Ofer Eilot and Miri Anani.

Students come to this school from Ramat Gan, Tel Aviv, Givatayim, Bnei Brak and Giv'at Shmuel.

Departments

Human resource management
The modern concept refers to the employee as an "asset" and in order to know how to manage this property, it is important to acquire knowledge and professional tools in the management of human resources.

Geography

Computer network
This program trains its students to use computer and communication technologies. Students in the program study basic subjects in the world of computing, through the study of communication systems, open systems, graphical application systems, information systems and proprietary knowledge systems.

The studies include theoretical studies and the implementation of the material studied through work in communication laboratories and virtual and physical dismantling and assembly laboratories. Students must submit a project during their studies and also a final work at the end of their studies. Students learn to work with systems to create computer networks and communications and manage communication systems.

External links
School website (in Hebrew)

References

High schools in Israel
Buildings and structures in Ramat Gan
Educational institutions established in 2003
2003 establishments in Israel